Half.com was an e-commerce website and a subsidiary of eBay in which sellers offered items for sale at fixed prices. The items available on half.com were limited to books, textbooks, music, movies, video games, and video game consoles.

Half provided a platform where sellers could choose what price to sell their item for. A seller was able to see the average and most recent sale prices for any particular item to determine the selling price desired. A potential buyer could see available inventory for an item and choose their desired seller. This was a different model from eBay, which has buyers bid against one another. The pre-order feature allowed buyers to set a price and quality rating of a particular item they would like to buy. Sellers saw the pre-order listed when they put an item up for sale and could sell it to the buyer if they agreed with the buyer's price.

There were no fees to list items on Half.com, but rather the company took a commission of every completed sale. The seller was responsible for shipping any item within three business days of a sale and paying the actual shipping costs. eBay shut down the service on September 1, 2017.

History
Half.com was founded in 1999 by American entrepreneur Josh Kopelman and Sunny Balijepalli. As an advertising gimmick, in December of the same year, the company paid the town of Halfway, Oregon US$100,000 and donated 20 new computers to change its name to "Half.com, Oregon" for a year.

eBay purchased Half.com in 2000 for roughly $350 million, integrating its user management system, buyer/seller feedback, and account information into eBay. Like its parent company, Half.com was not a retail site and had no physical stock or inventory.  Rather, the site offered a place for individual sellers to list their items and potential buyers a central location in which to view them, offering both a standardized transaction and money exchange process.  Unlike its parent, Half.com was not an auction site; sellers offered their wares at a bid price of their choosing.  Like Amazon.com, Half.com played a large role in the used textbook and CD markets. eBay planned to integrate Half.com into eBay and eventually close down Half.com. Many of the features that made listing media items such as CDs and DVDs quick and easy were integrated into eBay, but eBay kept Half.com running separately primarily for the textbook market.

Half.com began accepting PayPal in January 2013, ten and a half years after eBay acquired PayPal. Sellers were paid by pre-arranged deposits into a designated personal checking account.

On November 17, 2016, it was announced that Half.com commission rates would increase significantly, with lower-priced item rates going from 15% to 25%. The rates went into effect on December 16, 2016, with the initial notification to sellers being sent out less than a month prior and right in the midst of the holiday shopping season. The move was seen as an attempt by eBay to soon force the closure of Half.com.

On June 16, 2017, eBay notified Half.com members via email that Half.com would be closing on August 31, 2017. The site closed on September 1, 2017, but continued to process returns and refunds until October 31, 2017.

Operation
There were no fees to list items on Half.com. The company took a commission of every completed sale. In January 2009, the commission was 15% if the fixed selling price was $50 or less, 12.5% if the price was more than $50 but less than $100.01, 10% if the price was more than $100 but less than $250.01, 7.5% if the price was more than $250 but less than $500.01, and 5% if the price was more than $500.

The seller was responsible for shipping any item within three business days of a sale and paying the actual shipping costs. A shipping and handling fee was added to the transaction and was (partially) credited to the seller as a reimbursement. The buyer could choose either USPS Media Mail or expedited delivery. Depending on the weight of the item, the reimbursement amount was often less than the actual shipping costs. For example, the shipping reimbursement for any DVD sent via USPS Media Mail was $2.39. If the reimbursement amount exceeded the actual shipping costs, many sellers offered a "free upgrade" to first class shippingwhich was not much more expensive than media mail for small items such as CDs.

The "quality rating" of an item (Brand New, Like New, Very Good, Good and Acceptable), was disclosed to buyers before order placement, along with a text description entered by the seller.

The feedback about each individual seller was disclosed before order placement, linking the eBay feedback system, which allowed the buyer to choose their merchant.

References

External links 
FAQ regarding the closure of half.com

Online marketplaces of the United States
Book selling websites
EBay
Internet properties established in 1999
Internet properties disestablished in 2017
2000 mergers and acquisitions
1999 establishments in the United States